The 2003 Nigerian Senate election in Enugu State was held on April 12, 2003, to elect members of the Nigerian Senate to represent Enugu State. Ken Nnamani representing Enugu East, Ike Ekweremadu representing Enugu West and Fidelis Okoro representing Enugu North all won on the platform of the Peoples Democratic Party.

Overview

Summary

Results

Enugu East 
The election was won by Ken Nnamani of the Peoples Democratic Party.

Enugu West 
The election was won by Ike Ekweremadu of the Peoples Democratic Party.

Enugu North 
The election was won by Fidelis Okoro of the Peoples Democratic Party.

References 

April 2003 events in Nigeria
Enugu State Senate elections
Enu